Brett Simpson is an American surfer and coach from Huntington Beach, California.  He is the inaugural head coach of the United States Olympic surfing team.  As a surfer, he won the 2009 U.S. Open of Surfing contest, and repeated again in 2010 by successfully defending his title against South African surfer Jordy Smith.   Simpson was named the Orange County Surfer of the Year in 2008 and 2009.

He is the son of American football player Bill Simpson.  He is a graduate of Huntington Beach High School.

References

1985 births
American sports coaches
American surfers
Living people
National team coaches
Sportspeople from Huntington Beach, California
World Surf League surfers